Al Madkhal ila Ulum al Hadith al Sharif is a book on Uloomul Hadith written by Bangladeshi Deobandi Islamic scholar Muhammad Abdul Malek. Hadith Books have been compiled in various formats. The method of compiling all the texts is not the same. This book has simply given the basic idea of ​​how to extract a hadith from a number of hadith books. It was first published in 1998. The introduction of the book is written by Abdur Rashid Nomani. The book has been included in the curriculum of educational institutions in different countries including India, South Africa and Bangladesh. Among the big institutions in Bangladesh, Harun Islamabadi was the first to include Al Madkhal in the syllabus of Al Jamia Al Islamia Patiya. It was selected as the best-selling book by the publication at Cairo International Book Fair in 2021, organized by the Egyptian Ministry of Culture.

Features	
The book is a strong response to misinterpretations of hadith. The main topics of this book are: the method of doing Takhrij, the method of acquiring familiarity with profiles of narrators, how to recognize authentic Aḥadīth from inauthentic Aḥadīth. According to writer, Ar-Risalah al-Mustatrifah Li Bayan Mashuri Kutub as-Sunnah al-Musharrafah by al-Muhaddith Muḥammad bin Ja’far al-Kattani [d. 1345], Buhuth Fi as-Sunnati al-Musharrafah by Akram al-Umari and Fawa’id Jami‘ah Bar ‘Ujjalah Nafiah by ‘Abdul Haleem Chishti, will familiarize the students with the names of the most important books on Ḥadīth and Asma ar-Rijal. The main features of the book are fluency of language and easy presentation.

See also 
Deobandi hadith studies

References

External links 

Deobandi hadith literature
Bangladeshi books
Hadith
20th-century Arabic books
1998 books
Islamic literature